Fudbalski klub Trepča, commonly known as Trepča, is a Serbian football club based in North Mitrovica, in North Kosovo. Despite being located in Kosovo, the club plays in the Serbian football league system, currently in the third tier Serbian League West. The club was founded in 1932.

After the Kosovo war, many of the Kosovo Albanian players left the now Serbian club FK Trepča and decided to found their own club, which was carried out in 1999. The Albanian club received the name KF Trepça, the Albanian name for FK Trepča, thus there were two clubs in the city with virtually the same name. In 2010, the Serbian FK Trepča merged with the local Serbian club FK Partizan Kosovska Mitrovica and integrated with it.

Name
The club was named after the former Trepča Mines, which are located north-east of Kosovska Mitrovica. It was first known as FK Rudar Kosovska Mitrovica until 1962 when it was named FK Trepča.

History
FK Trepča was found in 1932.

Due to the consequences of the Kosovo war, in 1999, the Kosovo Serbian players decided to leave KF Trepça and found their own club. The Albanian club received the name KF Trepça, the Albanian name for FK Trepča, thus there were two clubs in the city with virtually the same name.

In the season 2001–02 they finished bottom of the Serbian League Morava and were relegated. In the season 2003–04 they played in the 1/16 finals of the Serbia and Montenegro Cup. In the season 2004–05 FK Trepča was playing in the Serbian fourth level, Šumadijska zona, and finished 15th.  They played their matches in Zubin Potok. In the season 2006–07 they played again in the Šumadija zone finishing 10th.

FK Trepča reached the pre-eliminary round of the 2011–12 Serbian Cup.  They played it after winning the Kosovo and Metohija qualifying group.

In April 2013, Trepča attended a friendly match against the Serbian top level club Partizan in Belgrade, which symbolized the solidarity with Serbs from Kosovo, which Trepča narrowly lost with 2–3. Both goals for Trepča were scored by Perica Ilić. A year later, they also played a friendly match with same character against the other Serbian top club Red Star Belgrade, which they lost by 0–3.

Stadium
From 1990 to this date, the club do not have its own venue.

After the war in 1999, the city was divided into a southern part with almost exclusively Kosovo Albanian and a northern part with non-Albanian or predominantly Serb population.

The Trepča Stadium is located in the southern part of the city, thus the FK Trepča is not possible to play its home matches in their home stadium. Currently, only Albanian teams play in Trepča Stadium, including the 1999 founded KF Trepça, who have the stadium virtually annexed and finally renamed. The Trepča Stadium is called now by the Kosovo Albanian population as Olympik Stadiumi Adem Jashari, after Adem Jashari, a former leader of the Albanian military  organisation UÇK, but the non-Albanian population still called Stadion Trepča. Because of these current difficult political situation, Trepča plays its home games near Zvečan, in 3.500 seater Zvečan Stadium.

Club colors
The club colors are green and black, which are also included in the coat of arms of the city, and were also the colors prior to the merger and the integration of Partizan Kosovska Mitrovica. To the club color of Partizan Belgrade belonged also red and blue. Thus, the away kit of Partizan Kosovska Mitrovica wore these colors were symbolic the main colors of the Serbian flag. It was similar at Partizan Belgrade.

International matches
The club has played three international matches in 1977/78:
Trepča 1:3 against Real Zaragoza in Spain
Trepča 1:3 against FK Sliven in Bulgaria
Trepča 1:1 against SK Tirana in Albania

Honours
First League of North Kosovo (3)
Champion: 2002–03, 2005–06, 2008–09
Kosovo and Metohija Cup (5)
Champion: 1992, 2003, 2011, 2012, 2014

Notes

References

External links
FK Trepča on Srbijasport
FK Trepča and KF Trepça rivalry

Football clubs in Serbia
Football clubs in Kosovo
Sport in Mitrovica, Kosovo
Association football clubs established in 1932